The 1947–48 season was the 49th completed season of The Football League.

Final league tables

The tables below are reproduced here in the exact form that they can be found at The Rec.Sport.Soccer Statistics Foundation website and in Rothmans Book of Football League Records 1888–89 to 1978–79, with home and away statistics separated.

Beginning with the season 1894–95, clubs finishing level on points were separated according to goal average (goals scored divided by goals conceded), or more properly put, goal ratio. In case one or more teams had the same goal difference, this system favoured those teams who had scored fewer goals. The goal average system was eventually scrapped beginning with the 1976–77 season.

From the 1922–23 season, the bottom two teams of both Third Division North and Third Division South were required to apply for re-election.

First Division

Arsenal, the most successful English club side of the 1930s, picked up their first postwar silverware, finishing top of the First Division by seven points. Their nearest rivals were Manchester United, who lifted the FA Cup with a dramatic 4-2 win over Blackpool at Wembley to end their 37-year wait for a major trophy. Burnley finished level on points with Matt Busby's team. Derby County, the 1946 FA Cup-winners, finished fourth in the league. Defending champions Liverpool finished 11th.

Grimsby Town were relegated in bottom place, 14 points adrift of safety, and were joined in the Second Division by Blackburn Rovers.

Results

Maps

Second Division

Results

Maps

Third Division North

Results

Maps

Third Division South

Results

Maps

See also
1947-48 in English football
1947 in association football
1948 in association football

References
Ian Laschke: Rothmans Book of Football League Records 1888–89 to 1978–79. Macdonald and Jane’s, London & Sydney, 1980.

English Football League seasons
Eng
1